Drillia umbilicata is a species of sea snail, a marine gastropod mollusk in the family Drilliidae.

Description
The shell grows to a length of 32 mm. The shell is light yellowish brown or yellowish white. It shows prominent, distant ribs, forming a strongly tuberculate shoulder, and revolving striae. The anal sinus is produced upwards. The inner lip is thickened below, forming with the axis a false umbilicus.

Distribution
This species occurs in the demersal zone of the Atlantic Ocean off Sierra Leone and from Gabon to Angola.

References

  Tucker, J.K. 2004 Catalog of recent and fossil turrids (Mollusca: Gastropoda). Zootaxa 682:1–1295

External links
 

umbilicata
Gastropods described in 1838